In applied mathematics, symmetric successive over-relaxation (SSOR), is a preconditioner.

If the original matrix can be split into diagonal, lower and upper triangular as  then the SSOR preconditioner matrix is defined as

See also
Successive over-relaxation

References 

Numerical linear algebra